The Gloucester Citizen is a local British weekly newspaper covering the areas of Gloucester, Stroud and the Forest of Dean. It was a six-day-a-week newspaper until it went weekly in October 2017. The Gloucester Citizen is headquartered at Gloucester Quays along with its sister newspaper the Gloucestershire Echo. Its current editor is Rachael Sugden.

History
The newspaper was originally founded on 9 April 1722 as The Gloucester Journal. The Citizen first appeared on 1 May 1876.

Editions
The Gloucester Citizen is a former daily (six days per week) newspaper which went weekly from the October 12, 2017 issue, publishing on Thursdays. Before the changed frequency, it had a Saturday edition containing the Weekend magazine. There was also a Forest of Dean edition of the newspaper which was released on a Wednesday. The Pink 'Un, focusing on the sport side of the county, was a supplement which came out each Monday with the newspaper and Citizen People focusing on the individual local communities also releases on Monday.

Ownership
In 2012, Local World acquired owner Northcliffe Media from Daily Mail and General Trust. In 2015, Trinity Mirror bought Local World's newspapers and online services.

See also
Gloucestershire Echo, a sister paper for the Cheltenham area.

References

External links
Gloucester Citizen

Newspapers published in Gloucestershire
Publications established in 1876
1876 establishments in England
Daily newspapers published in the United Kingdom